Astellas Cycling Team was an American UCI Continental cycling team. The team was originally established in 2012 as a Domestic Elite team under the name Astellas Oncology Cycling Team. The team turned professional and stepped up to UCI Continental status in 2014. In September 2016 the team confirmed that it had disbanded due to sponsor Astellas Pharma choosing to discontinue its funding, with the team having competed in its final race, the Boston Mayor's Cup, earlier that month.

Team roster

References

External links
 

Defunct cycling teams based in the United States
Astellas Pharma
UCI Continental Teams (America)
Cycling teams established in 2014
Cycling teams disestablished in 2016
2014 establishments in the United States